Chorus is a provider of telecommunications infrastructure throughout New Zealand. It is listed on the NZX stock exchange and is in the NZX 50 Index. It is the owner of the majority of telephone lines and exchange equipment in New Zealand. It is responsible for building approximately 70% of the new fibre optic Ultra-Fast Broadband network, and received a government subsidy of $929 million to do it.

The company was split from Telecom New Zealand in 2011, as a condition of winning the majority of the contracts for the Government's Ultra-Fast Broadband Initiative. By law, it cannot sell directly to consumers, but instead provides wholesale services to retailers.

Products

Copper

Most of the telephone infrastructure in New Zealand is owned by Chorus. , Chorus can provide ADSL service to 97.3% and VDSL2 (up to 70/10 Mbit/s) service to 62.4% of its copper phone lines.

Contrary to the usual practice overseas, most connections are at full speed, instead plans differ in the amount of data included. As DSL is sensitive to distance, the closer the customer is to the equipment, the faster the connections. Chorus has implemented a fibre-to-the-node (also known as "cabinetisation") project to bring the equipment closer to the user, so 91% of the lines are able to access an ADSL2+ connection of 10Mbit/s or more.

The copper loop is unbundled, so operators like Vodafone and Vocus can install their own equipment at telephone exchanges and just rent the copper line from Chorus. , 130,000 (7%) lines are unbundled.

Fibre
Chorus has the task of installing the majority of the New Zealand government's ultra-fast broadband (UFB) fibre. The Ultra-Fast Broadband: Invitation to Participate in Partner Selection Process was issued by the Ministry of Economic Development in October 2009, detailing 75% of New Zealanders to be connected over 10 years, with priority broadband users such as businesses, schools and health services to claim focus for the first six years.

In April 2013 Chorus signed contracts with Visionstream
and Downer worth NZ$1 billion to build its part of New Zealand's ultra-fast broadband network, after receiving a government subsidy of $929 million. Early in 2014 Transfield Services signed agreements to help build the UFB network.

History
Telecom created Chorus as a separate business unit in 2008. In 2011, Chorus won most of the contracts for the UFB fibre network. A condition of the contracts is that Chorus be demerged into a separate company. This was recommended unanimously by the Telecom board of directors and approved by 99.8% of Telecom shareholders.

On December 1, 2011, Chorus was formally separated from Telecom and listed on NZX. Chorus got Telecom's copper lines, cabinets, most telephone exchange buildings, DSLAMs and some fibre back-haul. Telecom retained the relationship with retail customers, the POTS telephone exchange equipment, some fibre back-haul, the shares in Southern Cross cable and the XT mobile network. On August 8, 2014, Telecom was rebranded as Spark.

The company is part of New Zealand Telecommunications Forum.

References

External links

 
 Chorus network upgrade map

Telecommunications companies of New Zealand
Companies based in Wellington
Companies listed on the New Zealand Exchange
Companies listed on the Australian Securities Exchange
New Zealand companies established in 2011
Telecommunications companies established in 2011
Dual-listed companies